Forbesganj Assembly constituency is an assembly constituency in Araria district in the Indian state of Bihar. Vidyasagar Kesari is the MLA of Forbesganj assembly constituency elected in 2015 and 2020.

History
As per Delimitation of Parliamentary and Assembly constituencies Order, 2008, No 48  Forbesganj Assembly constituency is composed of the following: Forbesganj community development block.

Forbesganj Assembly constituency is part of No 9 Araria (Lok Sabha constituency) (SC).

In 2015 Bihar Legislative Assembly election, Forbesganj was one of the 36 seats to have VVPAT enabled electronic voting machines.

Members of Legislative Assembly

Election results

1977-2010
In the 2010 state assembly elections, Padam Parag Roy Venu of BJP won the Forbesganj assembly seat defeating his nearest rival Maya Nand Thakur of LJP. Contests in most years were multi cornered but only winners and runners up are being mentioned. Laxmi Narayan Mehta of BJP defeated Zakir Hussain Khan of RJD in October 2005 and February 2005. Zakir Hussain Khan representing BSP defeated Laxmi Narayan Mehta, Independent, in 2000. Mayanand Thakur representing BJP defeated Laxmi Narayan Mehta, Independent, in 1995, and Shital Prasad Gupta of Congress in 1990. Saryu Mishra of Congress defeated Rai Bahadur Keshri of BJP in 1985, Nakshtra Malakar of CPI in 1980 and Lal Chand Sahni of JP.

Vidyasagar Kesari was first elected in 2015 Bihar Legislative Assembly election, and re-elected in 2020 Bihar Legislative Assembly election.

Election results

2020

References

External links
 

Assembly constituencies of Bihar
Politics of Araria district